Favartia salvati is a species of sea snail, a marine gastropod mollusc in the family Muricidae, the murex snails or rock snails.

Description

Distribution
This marine species occurs in the Austral Archipelago, French Polynesia.

References

 Houart, R. & Tröndle, J., 2008. Update of Muricidae (excluding Coralliophilinae) from French Polynesia with description of ten new species. Novapex 9(2-3): 53-93

Muricidae
Gastropods described in 2008